Anisopodus ligneus is a species of beetle in the family Cerambycidae that was described by Henry Walter Bates in 1863.

References

Anisopodus
Beetles described in 1863